Kincardineshire (or the Mearns) was a constituency represented in the Parliament of Scotland until 1707.

List of shire commissioners

 1607: Laird of Allerdes (Allerdes) 
 1612: John Allerdes, friar of that Ilk 
 1612, 1625, 1630: David Ramsay of Balmain
 1617 and 1630: Sir Alexander Strachan of Thornton
 1621: Alexander Burnett of Leys
 1639–41, 1645–46, 1661–63: Sir Gilbert Ramsay of Balmain
 1661–63: Alexander Stratton of that Ilk and of Lowrieston 
1665 convention: not represented
 1667, 1669–74: Sir David Carnegie of Pitarrow
 1672–73: Sir David Ramsay of Balmain
 1678 (convention), 1681–82, 1685–86 Sir Alexander Falconer of Glenfarquhar
 1678 (convention), 1681–82, 1685–86: Sir John Falconer of Balnakellie (died c.1685) 
 1686 William Rait, Laird of Hallgreen
 1689 (convention), 1689–1702 Alexander Arbuthnott of Knox
 1689 (convention), 1689–1701, 1702–1707: Sir Thomas Burnett of Leys
 1702–04: Sir James Falconer of Phesdoe (died 1705) 
 1705–07: Sir David Ramsay of Balmain

References

Kincardineshire
Politics of Aberdeenshire
Constituencies of the Parliament of Scotland (to 1707)
1707 disestablishments in Scotland
Constituencies disestablished in 1707